Ion Cristian Stanciu (born 29 December 1973) is a Romanian luger. He competed at the 1998 Winter Olympics and the 2002 Winter Olympics.

References

External links
 

1973 births
Living people
Romanian male lugers
Olympic lugers of Romania
Lugers at the 1998 Winter Olympics
Lugers at the 2002 Winter Olympics
Sportspeople from Bucharest